Huang Jiahui (born 7 October 2000) is a Chinese professional footballer currently playing as a defender for Chinese Super League club Dalian Professional.

Club career
Born in Shanghai, Huang was invited to join the academy of Spanish side Valencia, as part of the Wanda Group initiative to bring young Chinese players to Spanish clubs. On his return he would join Wanda Group owned Dalian Professional and be promoted to their senior within the 2019 Chinese Super League season. He would make his debut in a league game on 15 June 2019 against Hebei China Fortune F.C. in a 1-0 defeat where he came on as a late substitute for Zhou Ting. On 19 July 2021, he scored his first career goal in a 3-2 defeat against Shanghai Shenhua.

He would go on to establish himself as a regular member of the team due to the Chinese Super League rules requesting every team to field at least one player under 23 years old at any point of the game. On 8 June 2022, when Dalian won their second league game of the season 2-0 against Guangzhou City it was overturned to a 3-0 defeat. The reason being that Huang was the team's only designated U-23 player on the pitch, when he was taken off at the 68th minute due to an injury he was substituted by non-U-23 player Wu Wei, and the game went back to play. Despite subsequently rectifying this mistake and bringing on two U-23 players after 47 seconds, they were penalized for that 47-second gap and Guangzhou city was awarded a 3-0 win.

International career
On 20 July 2022, Huang made his international debut in a 3-0 defeat against South Korea in the 2022 EAFF E-1 Football Championship, as the Chinese FA decided to field the U-23 national team for this senior competition.

Personal life
Huang is the brother of China women's under-17 player Huang Jiaxin.

Career statistics

.

References

External links

2000 births
Living people
Footballers from Shanghai
Chinese footballers
China youth international footballers
China international footballers
Association football defenders
Chinese Super League players
Valencia CF players
Dalian Professional F.C. players
Chinese expatriate footballers
Chinese expatriate sportspeople in Spain
Expatriate footballers in Spain